Just Cause is a 1995 American crime thriller film directed by Arne Glimcher and starring Sean Connery and Laurence Fishburne. It is based on John Katzenbach's novel of the same name.

Plot
Paul Armstrong, a liberal Harvard professor and former lawyer opposed to capital punishment, is persuaded by an elderly woman to go to Florida to investigate the conviction of her grandson Bobby Earl Ferguson for murder. Ferguson, a former Cornell University student, was convicted of raping and brutally murdering a young white girl named Joanie Shriver eight years prior. Ferguson tells Armstrong that he was physically and psychologically tortured by two police detectives to get a forced confession, but firmly states he is innocent. Armstrong, believing in his innocence, must save him from being executed in the electric chair. As Armstrong digs deeper into the case, he discovers that Tanny Brown, the chief detective on the case, did indeed coerce Ferguson's confession.

Ferguson tells the professor that the murder was actually committed by Blair Sullivan, a serial killer awaiting execution. According to Ferguson, Sullivan constantly taunts him about his conviction for the crime. Sullivan, through the use of Biblical cryptic clues, later reveals the location of the knife used to kill the girl. Armstrong and Brown go to the place, where Armstrong asks Brown to retrieve the knife as Brown's the actual police officer. Brown tries to threaten Armstrong into abandoning the investigation. Armstrong then discovers why Brown is so passionate to get Ferguson convicted: the murdered girl was Brown's daughter's best friend. With a new testimony and with the murder weapon at hand, Ferguson gets a re-trial and is acquitted and thereafter freed from prison. Subsequently, the governor authorizes Sullivan's execution.

Armstrong receives a call from Sullivan, who says he has a final clue to share, but first wants Armstrong to visit Sullivan's parents and tell them he said goodbye. Arriving at the house, Armstrong sees various religious items before finding their butchered decaying bodies. Back at the prison, Sullivan gloats that he and Ferguson struck a deal: Ferguson would kill Sullivan's parents in exchange for freedom, while Sullivan would claim responsibility for the girl's murder, which Ferguson did in fact commit. Armstrong asks why he was needed for their scheme, and Sullivan replies that was "Bobby Earl's call", meaning that Armstrong would be much more believable in establishing the verdicts than either Ferguson or Sullivan. Armstrong, in his anger at being played, lies to Sullivan and tells him his parents were alive and that they "forgive him." Sullivan becomes enraged. Afterwards, he is forcefully taken by the guards to the electric chair, where he is executed.

Armstrong and Brown go after Ferguson, after Armstrong suspects that Ferguson has kidnapped his wife and daughter. Ferguson's motives for everything turn out to be a desire for revenge on Armstrong's wife Laurie; she was the prosecutor against him in a previous kidnapping case which, while ultimately dropped due to lack of evidence, resulted in him being brutalized and castrated in jail when she had him remanded to make a name for herself, as well as losing his scholarship and being kicked out of Cornell in the process, thus robbing him of any chance of a family or a decent future. At the local regional swamps, Armstrong finds his wife and daughter in a small shack, where Ferguson appears. Ferguson's plans include raping and murdering Armstrong's wife and daughter and then disappearing. At a critical moment, Brown reappears (after seemingly being attacked and killed by Ferguson) and he and Armstrong join forces. Armstrong stabs Ferguson to death and his body is subsequently eaten by an alligator. Armstrong's family is thus saved.

Cast
 Sean Connery as Paul Armstrong
 Laurence Fishburne as Detective Tanny Brown
 Kate Capshaw as Laurie Prentiss Armstrong
 Blair Underwood as Bobby Earl Ferguson
 Ed Harris as Blair Sullivan
 Christopher Murray as Detective J.T. Wilcox
 Ruby Dee as Evangeline Ferguson
 Scarlett Johansson as Katie Armstrong
 Daniel J. Travanti as The Warden
 Ned Beatty as McNair
 Kevin McCarthy as Phil Prentiss
 Hope Lange as Libby Prentiss
 Chris Sarandon as Lyle Morgan
 Liz Torres as Delores Rodriguez
 George Plimpton as Elder Phillips
 Lynne Thigpen as Ida Conklin
 Barbara Jean Kane as Joanie Shriver
 Taral Hicks as Lena Brown
 Maurice Jamaal Brown as Reese Brown
 Brooke Alderson as Dr. Doliveau
 Victor Slezak as Sergeant Rogers
 Vitamin C as The Prosecutor (Colleen Fitzpatrick)
 Joel S. Ehrenkranz as The Judge
 Richard Liberty as The Chaplain

Production

Sean Connery turned down the role of King Edward I in Braveheart in order to star in this film. Originally, Will Smith was in talks to take on the role of Bobby Earl Ferguson. Connery and director Arne Glimcher were close friends, and Glimcher took on directing duties so that they could both work on the film together.
 
Principal photography began on May 16, 1994, and took place in and around the state of Florida. Locations include Bonita Springs, Fort Denaud, Fort Myers, Gainesville, Miami Beach, as well as around Lee and Collier counties. Filming also included Harvard Square in Cambridge, Massachusetts. Production wrapped on August 2, 1994, and also marked the final theatrical film for Hope Lange.

Release

Just Cause was released on February 17, 1995, in 2,052 theatres. It opened at number 2 at the US box office grossing $10.6 million in its opening weekend. It remained at number 2 for its second week, grossing $6.6 million. The film went on to gross $36.8 million in the United States and Canada and $63 million worldwide.

Reception

Unlike Glimcher's previous film, The Mambo Kings, Just Cause received mostly negative reviews, with a "Rotten" 26% rating on Rotten Tomatoes based on 31 reviews. The site's consensus states; "Just Cause you round up a phenomenal cast, that doesn't mean you have everything you need for a solid legal thriller -- and this film is forgettable proof."

Gene Siskel and Roger Ebert both commented that the film's first half is quite good, particularly as a character study, but in its second half it becomes buried in gratuitous plot twists before ending in a ludicrous showdown. However, Siskel ultimately recommended the film, while Ebert did not. Janet Maslin praised the performances of Laurence Fishburne and Ed Harris, but found the entire film is colored by director Arne Glimcher's inappropriately polished and antiseptic visual style. She summarized it as "a crime story so gritless that even the forensic photos of a stabbing victim look good." Lisa Schwarzbaum likewise praised Fishburne's performance and blamed the film's artistic failure on the direction, saying Glimcher consistently drained the story of its thrills with heavy-handedness. She gave the film a C−. Audiences polled by CinemaScore gave the film an average grade of "B+" on an A+ to F scale.

Television adaptation
In late November of 2022, it was reported by Deadline Hollywood and other media outlets that Scarlett Johansson, who played Katie Armstrong in the film, had signed to star and executive produce an Amazon Prime Video limited series based on Just Cause from writer Christy Hall with a gender-flipped version of Matt Cowart known as Madison "Madi" Cowart as the main protagonist.

References

External links

 Just Cause at Rotten Tomatoes

1995 films
1995 crime thriller films
1990s legal films
American crime thriller films
Films about capital punishment
Films about miscarriage of justice
Films based on American crime novels
Films directed by Arne Glimcher
Films scored by James Newton Howard
Films set in Miami
Films shot in Florida
Films shot in Massachusetts
Films with screenplays by Jeb Stuart
Warner Bros. films
1990s English-language films
1990s American films